Donald "Nipper" O'Hearn (February 14, 1928 – January 25, 2015) was a Canadian professional ice hockey goaltender who played over 200 games combined in the Pacific Coast Hockey League, United States Hockey League, American Hockey League, Maritime Major Hockey League, Quebec Hockey League, International Hockey League, and Eastern Hockey League. He was born in Halifax, Nova Scotia but grew up in St. Catharines, Ontario. He died after a long illness in a hospital at St. Catharines in 2015.

References

External links
 

1928 births
2015 deaths
Baltimore Clippers players
Canadian ice hockey goaltenders
Fort Wayne Komets players
Fort Worth Rangers players
Fresno Falcons players
Greensboro Generals players
Ice hockey people from Nova Scotia
Ice hockey people from Ontario
Indianapolis Chiefs players
Muskegon Zephyrs players
New Haven Eagles players
Oakland Oaks (PCHL) players
Philadelphia Ramblers players
Sportspeople from Halifax, Nova Scotia
Sportspeople from St. Catharines
Springfield Indians (NAHL) players
Syracuse Warriors players
Vancouver Canucks (WHL) players